Syed Zamir Jafri (Urdu:  سيد ضمير شاه جعفري) (January 1, 1916 – May 12, 1999) was a Pakistani poet, writer, social critic, comedian, columnist, broadcaster and telecaster. He is best known for his work revolved around his Urdu poetry.

Biography
Zamir Jafri was born in a Syed family. He was the father of former Pakistan Inter-Services Intelligence (ISI), Ehtesham Zamir. His native village, Chak Abdul Khaliq, is located near Dina, in the Jhelum district.

Jafri has had great influence on Urdu poetry, and has focused on themes of peace and love for mankind. He had published 78 books of poetry and prose, written in Urdu, Punjabi, and English.  

Jafri was posted to the Far East where he continued to serve in the Education Corps of Pakistan Army and participated in the Indo-Pakistani wars of 1947–1948 and 1965. He retired from the Army as a Major in 1965 and was appointed the first Director Public Relations of Capital Development Authority - a body formed to look after the development of Pakistan’s newly announced capital at Islamabad. Jafri remained at this post for over fifteen years and had the honor of naming the roads and residential/commercial sectors of the new capital. Thereafter, he served on contract assignments as Deputy Director-General of Pakistan National Centre in the Ministry of Information, as Advisor to the Chief Commissioner Afghan Refugees and lastly as Chief Editor in the Academy of Letters.

See also
 Zamir Jaffri Cricket Stadium

References

Citations

Bibliography

External links
Official home page

1916 births
1999 deaths
People from Jhelum District
Poets from Lahore
Pakistani poets
Urdu-language poets from Pakistan
People from British India
People from Islamabad
20th-century poets
Recipients of the Pride of Performance